SolarFlix (formerly ETC) is a Philippine free-to-air television network owned by the Southern Broadcasting Network subsidiary of Solar Entertainment Corporation. Its digital free-to-air broadcast is carried by SBN's flagship station, DWCP-DTV (channel 21) in Metro Manila. The channel's analog broadcast is fed on its lone provincial TV station, DXSS-TV (channel 7) in Davao City (in which the station currently carries DepEd ALS TV programming). The channel is also carried by cable and satellite providers, including Sky Cable, Destiny Cable, Cablelink, Binangonan Cable TV Corporation, Cignal and SatLite, along with various provincial cable operators and through online streaming.

SolarFlix operates daily from 6 am to 12 midnight on Solar's digital free TV (under test broadcast), while it operates 24 hours daily on most pay TV and streaming service providers. However, starting Holy Week 2021, it continues to sign off from Maundy Thursday at midnight to Easter Sunday at 8:00 am along with its sister channels Solar Sports and Solar Learning. It formerly operated daily from 5:00 a.m. to 12:00 midnight on free-to-air analog TV broadcast until September 2019, when SBN permanently closed its analog signal.

SolarFlix broadcasts from Solar's master control facility and studios located at the Third Floor of the Worldwide Corporate Center, Epifanio de los Santos corner Shaw Boulevard, Mandaluyong, while Solar office is located at Solar Century Tower, 100 Tordesillas St., Corner H.V. Dela Costa St. Salcedo Village, Makati, SBN holds free-to-air broadcasts from its transmitter and tower site located at Nuestra Señora de la Paz Subdivision, Bo. Sta. Cruz, Antipolo, Rizal.

History

As ETC (2004-2022) 
On March 1, 2004, ETC was launched as "Entertainment Central". But the test broadcast started on November 24, 2003.

On January 1, 2008, ETC ceased to air over Sky Cable as a separated channel. As part of the Solar network's blocktime agreements with various terrestrial channels, the channel started airing over SBN 21, a terrestrial UHF TV station in the Philippines.

On March 2, 2011, ETC moved to RPN after the channel is private, while Talk TV, a news-oriented channel airing local and US news shows, launched on SBN 21.

But, ETC returned to SBN on November 30, 2013, as Solar News Channel moved to RPN on December 1 of 2013 to allow SNC's wider coverage. (SNC and RPN, however, were sold to the ALC Group of Companies chair, Ambassador Antonio Cabangon Chua, in August 2014, due to the Tieng's loss of revenue after investing on RPN.) 

After its sister channel 2nd Avenue ended broadcasting on June 5 after 12 years of broadcasting, many of its programs moved to ETC.

On November 21, 2018, ETC revealed its new station ID and on-air graphics. At the same time, the network also launched their new slogans, In Full Bloom and #IamETC.

As SolarFlix (2022-present) 
On June 7, 2022, a new channel was teased featuring a voice-over saying that the channel, "May bagong kakaaliwan ngayong July. Kaya tutok lang. Sagot ka namin!". On June 16, 2022, ETC unveiled the new channel and will be relaunched as SolarFlix on July 11, 2022 at 6pm (PST), a Tagalog movie channel that features classic and independent Filipino films (most of which came from Solar Films' archives), and documentaries from local movie festivals similar to GMA Network's I Heart Movies. Following the rebrand, Solar Entertainment Corporation announced to some cable and satellite TV operators who carry ETC will be replacing the channel with ScreamFlix by Jungo TV, which carries Front Row Channel and Hallypop on June 20, 2022, leaving SolarFlix as a digital free TV channel.

Programming

The channel targets the young adult demographics. SolarFlix's programming currently consists of Turkish dramas and Latin American telenovelas dubbed in Filipino under the ETCerye block, classic and independent Filipino films, and Hollywood and foreign acquired movies.

Relay and affiliate stations

See also
Front Row Channel
Shop TV
Solar Learning
Solar Sports
GTV
A2Z
I Heart Movies

Ratings
According to National Urban Television Audience Measurement, ETC is the top-ranked female television channel with cable and free TV ratings combined (January 2012 - May 2012) with a 10.33% audience share.

References

External links
Media Ownership Monitor Philippines - Television by VERA Files and Reporters Without Borders

Southern Broadcasting Network
Radio Philippines Network
Solar Entertainment Corporation channels
Television networks in the Philippines
Filipino-language television stations
Movie channels in the Philippines
Television channels and stations established in 2004
2003 establishments in the Philippines
Television channels and stations established in 2022